Niclas Lucenius (born May 3, 1989) is a Finnish professional ice hockey center. He is currently playing with Vaasan Sport of the Finnish Liiga. Lucenius was selected by the Atlanta Thrashers in the 4th round (115th overall) of the 2007 NHL Entry Draft.

Lucenius played for Tappara in SM-liiga from 2007–2011. He later reached agreement with Dinamo Riga played in Kontinental Hockey League in the 2011–12 season.

After parts of two seasons abroad, Lucenius returned to Finland during the 2016-17 season, joining LeKi of the Mestis.

References

External links 

1989 births
Atlanta Thrashers draft picks
HC '05 Banská Bystrica players
Dinamo Riga players
Düsseldorfer EG players
ETC Crimmitschau players
Finnish ice hockey centres
HPK players
Kiekko-Vantaa players
Living people
Lempäälän Kisa players
SC Rapperswil-Jona Lakers players
Tappara players
TuTo players
HC TPS players
Vaasan Sport players
Sportspeople from Turku
Finnish expatriate ice hockey players in Latvia
Finnish expatriate ice hockey players in Slovakia
Finnish expatriate ice hockey players in the United States
Finnish expatriate ice hockey players in France
Finnish expatriate ice hockey players in Switzerland
Finnish expatriate ice hockey players in Austria
Krefeld Pinguine players
Dragons de Rouen players
EHC Lustenau players